Capital punishment is one of two penalties for aggravated murder in the U.S. state of Oregon, with it being required by the Constitution of Oregon.

In November 2011, Governor John Kitzhaber announced a moratorium on executions in Oregon, canceling a planned execution and ordering a review of the death penalty system in the state. Kitzhaber's successor, Governor Kate Brown, affirmed her commitment to the moratorium.

Oregon no longer allows for nonunanimous juries in felony cases, and all felony (including capital) cases in Oregon require a unanimous jury verdict. 

In case of a hung jury during the penalty phase of the trial, a life sentence is issued, even if a single juror opposed death (there is no retrial).

The governor of Oregon has sole authority over clemency, including capital cases.

Executions are carried out by lethal injection in Oregon. 

The men's death row is located, and executions are carried out, at the Oregon State Penitentiary in Salem. Women on death row are held at Coffee Creek Correctional Facility until shortly before their execution.

Early history 
The first death sentence carried out under the territorial government, apart from the hanging of the 5 Cayuse in 1850, came on April 18, 1851, when William Kendall was hanged in Salem. Kendall's sentence was handed down by Judge William Strong of the Oregon Supreme Court. Five Cayuse Native American men were taken to Oregon City, tried and sentenced to hang. Before their execution on June 3, 1850, the leader, Tiloukaikt, accepted Catholic last rites. Tiloukaikt spoke on the gallows, "Did not your missionaries teach us that Christ died to save his people? So we die to save our people." 

Capital punishment was made explicitly legal by statute in 1864, and executions have been carried out exclusively at the Oregon State Penitentiary in Salem since 1904. The death penalty was outlawed between 1914 and 1920, again between 1964 and 1978, and then again between a 1981 Oregon Supreme Court ruling and a 1984 ballot measure.

Oregon voters amended the Constitution in 1914, to repeal the death penalty, by a margin of 50.04%. The repeal was an initiative of Governor Oswald West. However, the death penalty was restored in 1920 with 56% of voters favoring its use. From 1864 to 1931, executions were carried out by hanging. However, beginning with the execution of LeRoy Hershel McCarthy, on January 30, 1939, Oregon began using lethal gas in gas chamber executions. The state executed seventeen men in this manner, including Robert E. Lee Folkes. The last of these gas-inhalation executions took place on 20 August 1962, with the execution of Leroy McGahuey. In 1964 voters passed Measure 1, a constitutional amendment prohibiting capital punishment, with 60% of voters approving. Governor Mark Hatfield commuted the sentences of three death row inmates two days later.

Reinstatement 
Voters reenacted the death penalty in the general election of 1978, by statute; Measure 8 required the death penalty in certain murder cases. Measure 8 was overturned by the Oregon Supreme Court in 1981, on the grounds that it denied defendants the right to be tried by a jury of their peers.

In 1984, Measure 6 amended the state constitution to once more make the death penalty legal. Measure 7, a statutory measure passed in the same year, required a separate sentencing hearing before a jury in cases of aggravated murder.

In 1988, the U.S. Supreme Court ruling in Penry v. Lynaugh affected the Oregon death penalty, because Oregon's law is based on the Texas law involved in the case. Seventeen Oregon cases were remanded for resentencing following Penry; eight of those convicts were re-sentenced to death.

In 2000, the Benetton Group featured several inmates on Oregon's death row in a controversial anti-death penalty advertising campaign. Cesar Barone, Conan Wayne Hale, Jesse Caleb Compton, and Alberto Reyes Camarena were featured in the ad.

Between 1904 and 1994, 115 people were sentenced to death in Oregon, and 58 of those were executed.

On December 13, 2022, Governor Kate Brown announced that she would commute the sentences of all 17 death row inmates, effective December 14, 2022. She also directed the Oregon Department of Corrections to dismantle Oregon's lethal injection death chamber. Governor Brown's successor, Tina Kotek, stated her own personal opposition to the death penalty and her intention to continue the moratorium established by her predecessors.

Executions since 1978 
2 people have been executed in Oregon since the reinstatement of capital punishment in 1978. Both waived their appeals and asked that the execution be carried out.

Capital crimes 
Aggravated murder is the only crime punishable by death in Oregon. On 1 August 2019, Governor Kate Brown signed a bill that restricts the death penalty to four cases:

(1) acts of terrorism in which two or more people are killed by an organized terrorist group

(2) premeditated murders of children aged 13 or younger

(3) prison murders committed by those already incarcerated for aggravated murder

(4) premeditated murders of police or correctional officers

See also 
 List of death row inmates in Oregon
 Crime in Oregon
 Law of Oregon
 Jeannace June Freeman
 List of Oregon ballot measures

References

External links 
 History of Capital Punishment in Oregon from Oregon.gov
 Death penalty in Oregon, from the Oregon Encyclopedia

 
Oregon
Crime in Oregon
Oregon law